Manuel Antônio Farinha, first and only baron and count of Sousel (Souzel, Portugal — Rio de Janeiro, 27 May 1842) was a Brazilian admiral.

He was minister of the Navy in the first cabinet of Dom Pedro I, formed on 16 January 1822, until 22 October 1822.

He was made baron on 12 October 1825 and count on 12 October 1826. Also was Grandee of the Empire.

References 
 
 
 

Brazilian admirals
Brazilian nobility
Empire of Brazil politicians
Government ministers of Brazil
1842 deaths
Year of birth unknown
18th-century births